Stanton Territorial Hospital is a hospital based in Yellowknife, Northwest Territories and operated by the Northwest Territories Health and Social Services Authority. It is a 100-bed hospital and the biggest hospital in the territory providing 24/7 emergency care along with extended care, obstetrics, surgery, psychiatry, and pediatrics. Outpatient services include numerous specialities. Staff at the hospital cite numerous problems such as water leaking that are interfering with hospital operations.

Notable staff
 Courtney Howard
 Martha Codner

References

External links
Stanton Territorial Hospital

Buildings and structures in Yellowknife
Hospitals in the Northwest Territories
Hospital buildings completed in 1967